= Kharpi =

- village
- Location within Madhya Pradesh Location within India
- Coordinates: 23.1751824°N 77.2778694°E
- Country: India
- State: Madhya Pradesh
- District: Bhopal
- Tehsil: Huzur
- Elevation: 530 m (1,740 ft)

Population (2011)
  - Total: 542
- Time zone: UTC+5:30 (IST)
- ISO 3166 code: MP-IN
- 2011 census code: 482494

Kharpi is a village in the Bhopal district of Madhya Pradesh, India. It is located in the Huzur tehsil and the Phanda block.

== Demographics ==
According to the 2011 census of India, Kharpi has 113 households. The effective literacy rate (i.e. the literacy rate of population excluding children aged 6 and below) is 66.67%.

Demographics (2011 Census)
	Total	Male	Female
Population	542	291	251
Children aged below 6 years	71	39	32
Scheduled caste	23	9	14
Scheduled tribe	8	4	4
Literates	314	205	109
Workers (all)	294	153	141
Main workers (total)	150	128	22
Main workers: Cultivators	118	110	8
Main workers: Agricultural labourers	24	12	12
Main workers: Household industry workers	0	0	0
Main workers: Other	8	6	2
Marginal workers (total)	144	25	119
Marginal workers: Cultivators	46	15	31
Marginal workers: Agricultural labourers	89	7	82
Marginal workers: Household industry workers	3	0	3
Marginal workers: Others	6	3	3
Non-workers	248	138	110
